Frederic Seebohm, Baron Seebohm, TD (18 January 1909 – 15 December 1990), was a British banker, soldier and social work innovator.

Early life and background
Lord Seebohm's father was Hugh Exton Seebohm and grandfather was the historian Frederic Seebohm.

His mother was Lesley Gribble of Henlow Grange. His maternal grandparents were George Gribble, sometime High Sheriffs of Bedfordshire and Norah Royds, a Slade-trained artist who filled Lesley's childhood home with artistic and cultural figures. Frederic's maternal aunts and uncles included Phyllis Fordham of Ashwell Bury; Vivien Gribble, the engraver and illustrator; Major Philip Gribble, a writer and adventurer who married the daughter of Ronald McNeill, 1st Baron Cushendun and financed Anna Wolkoff; and Julian Royds Gribble, who won a VC at the end of World War I and died of influenza in a German prison of war camp.

He was born in Hitchin in Hertfordshire. He was educated at Leighton Park School and Trinity College, Cambridge.

Career
After university he joined the Barclays Bank, which had taken over the Hitchin Bank founded by his family. Seebohm served in the Royal Artillery, reaching the rank of lieutenant-colonel. He was mentioned in dispatches and was decorated with the Territorial Decoration.

Having been local director of the bank's branch office in Luton and Birmingham, Seebohm became director of the main board after the war. In 1951, he was made a member of the bank's overseas board and in 1965 chairman of the renamed Barclays Bank International. He retired seven years later.

In December 1965 Seebohm was appointed, by Douglas Houghton MP,  to chair the Committee on Local Authority Personal Social Services. The Committee published its findings in 1968. Amongst other things, the report recommended the establishment of a unified social service within each major local authority.

Seebohm was also chairman of the Overseas Development Institute.

Awards
Seebohm received a knighthood in 1970, and on 28 April 1972, he was created a life peer as Baron Seebohm, of Hertford in the County of Hertford. Between 1970 and 1971, he was High Sheriff of Hertfordshire, as his grandfather had been.   He was further president of the National Institute for Social Work, of the Royal African Society and of the Age Concern. He was further chairman of the Joseph Rowntree Memorial Trust (now the Joseph Rowntree Foundation) for 15 years and one of the founders of the York Council of Voluntary Service. For the London School of Economics and the Haileybury and Imperial Service College, he was governor and chairman of 3i .

Later life and family
In 1932, he married Evangeline Hurst, daughter of Sir Gerald Berkeley Hurst. They had one son and two daughters, including the writer Victoria Glendinning.

Seebohm died in a road accident in 1990, his wife a short time after.

Arms

References

 

1909 births
1990 deaths
Military personnel from Hertfordshire
Alumni of Trinity College, Cambridge
Royal Artillery officers
British Army personnel of World War II
English bankers
Crossbench life peers

Knights Bachelor
People educated at Leighton Park School
People associated with the London School of Economics
3i Group people
Road incident deaths in England
20th-century English businesspeople
Social care in England and Wales
Life peers created by Elizabeth II